Hiroki Iizuka may refer to the following:

 Hiroki Iizuka (footballer)
 Hiroki Iizuka (shogi)